Kljåkinnknippene is a mountain in Vang Municipality in Innlandet county, Norway. The mountain is surrounded by several other notable mountains including Tverrfjellet to the north, Skoddetinden and Suletinden to the northwest, Høgeloft to the southwest, and Ørnenosi and Øyre to the southeast.

See also
List of mountains of Norway by height

References

Vang, Innlandet
Mountains of Innlandet